Alan Wearne (born 23 July 1948) is an Australian poet.

Early life and education
Alan Wearne was born on 23 July 1948 and grew up in Melbourne. He studied history at Monash University, where he met the poets Laurie Duggan and John A. Scott. 
He was involved in the Poets Union.

Career
After publishing two collections of poetry, he wrote a verse novel, The Nightmarkets (1986), which won the Australian Book Council Banjo Award and was adapted for performance with Monash University Student Theatre.

His next book in the same genre, The Lovemakers, won the Kenneth Slessor Prize for Poetry and the NSW Premier's Book of the Year in 2002, as well as the Arts Queensland Judith Wright Calanthe Award. The first half of the novel was published by Penguin, and its second by the ABC in 2004 as The Lovemakers: Book Two, Money and Nothing and co-won The Foundation for Australian Literary Studies' Colin Roderick Award and the H. T. Priestly Medal. Despite this critical success neither book was promoted properly and both volumes ended up being pulped. Shearsman Press in the UK has since republished the book in a single volume.

These Things Are Real was published in 2017 by Giramondo Publishing. 

Wearne lectured in Creative Writing at the University of Wollongong until 2016.

Books
 Public Relations (1972) 
 New Devil, New Parish (1976)
 The Nightmarkets (Penguin, 1986) 
 Out Here (Newcastle upon Tyne : Bloodaxe Books 1987) 
 Kicking In Danger (Black Pepper 1997)  review
 The Lovemakers: Book One, Saying All The Great Sexy Things (Penguin, 2001)  
 The Lovemakers: Book Two, Money and Nothing (ABC, 2004)  review review
 Sarsaparilla A Calypso (Polar Bear Press, 2007) 
 The Australian Popular Songbook (Giramondo 2008) 
Prepare the Cabin for Landing (Giramondo 2012) 
 These Things Are Real (Giramondo 2017)

References

Further reading
ALM Australian Literature Resources : Alan Wearne Contents page excerpts etc.
Review

External links

Literary papers at UNSW Collections, Canberra

1948 births
Writing teachers
Living people
Poets from Melbourne
Monash University alumni
Academic staff of the University of Wollongong
ALS Gold Medal winners